Lewis Jack Leigh (born 5 December 2003) is an English professional footballer who plays as a midfielder for EFL Championship club Preston North End.

Career
Leigh began playing football at the youth academy of Liverpool at the age of 3 and a half, and stayed there until the age of 14 when he moved to his local club Preston North End. He first made the bench with Preston North End in a EFL Championship match against Milwall in March 2021. In August 2021, he signed his first professional contract with the club until 2024. He made his professional debut with Preston North End in a 4–1 EFL Cup win over Huddersfield Town on 9 August 2022, coming on as a substitute in the 88th minute.

Playing style
A diminutive midfielder, Leigh plays in front of the defense and pulls the strings with his long-range passing and relentless tackling.

References

External links
 

2003 births
Living people
Footballers from Preston, Lancashire
English footballers
Preston North End F.C. players
Association football midfielders